Robert Smith (c. 16 October 1689 – 2 February 1768) was an English mathematician.

Life

Smith was probably born at Lea near Gainsborough, the son of John Smith, the rector of Gate Burton, Lincolnshire and his wife Hannah Cotes. After attending Queen Elizabeth's Grammar School, Gainsborough (now Queen Elizabeth's High School) he entered Trinity College, Cambridge, in 1708, and becoming minor fellow in 1714, major fellow in 1715 and senior fellow in 1739, was chosen Master in 1742, in succession to Richard Bentley. From 1716 to 1760 he was Plumian Professor of Astronomy, and he died in the Master's Lodge at Trinity.

In February 1719 he was elected a Fellow of the Royal Society.

Besides editing two works by his cousin, Roger Cotes, who was his predecessor in the Plumian chair, he published A Compleat System of Opticks in 1738, which gained him the sobriquet of Old Focus, and Harmonics, or the Philosophy of Musical Sounds in 1749.

Smith never married but lived with his unmarried sister Elzimar (1683–1758) in the lodge at Trinity College. Although he is often portrayed as a rather reclusive character, John Byrom's journal shows that in the 1720s and 1730s Smith could be quite sociable. Yet ill health, particularly gout, took its toll and severely inhibited his academic work and social activities. He died at the lodge on 2 February 1768, and on 8 February he was buried in Trinity College Chapel, the funeral oration being delivered by Thomas Zouch.

According to the Oxford Dictionary of National Biography, Smith helped to spread Isaac Newton's ideas in Europe and "Newton's successes in optics and mechanics dominated Smith's scientific career".

The Smith Fund
In his will Smith left £3500 South Sea stock to the University of Cambridge. The net income on the fund is annually divided equally between the Smith's Prize and the stipend of the Plumian Professor.

Books

 Robert Smith, Harmonics, or, The Philosophy of Musical Sounds, Printed by J. Bentham, and sold by W. Thurlbourn, 1749.

References

The Master of Trinity at Trinity College, Cambridge

External links
 "Robert Smith, author of 'A Compleat System of Opticks', 1738." Peter Abrahams, ed. The history of the telescope & the binocular (2005)
 OR4-A1765.43: Enharmonic chamber organ, Thomas Parker. London, c.1765. Russell Collection of Early Keyboard Instruments, University of Edinburgh.
 "Robert Smith's 'Equal Harmony' and the harpsichord built for it by Jacob Kirckman." Grant O'Brien. Conference on the Historical Background to the New "Handel" Organ in St Cecilia's Hall. Russell Collection of Early Keyboard Instruments, University of Edinburgh. (1998)
 Dr. Robert Smith's comments on John Harrison's musical tuning ideas, from Harmonics (1749)
 
 
 Robert Smith's (1778) The elementary parts of Dr. Smith's compleat system of opticks – digital facsimile from the Linda Hall Library

18th-century English mathematicians
English music theorists
Masters of Trinity College, Cambridge
Fellows of the Royal Society
1689 births
1768 deaths
People educated at Queen Elizabeth's High School
Vice-Chancellors of the University of Cambridge
Fellows of Trinity College, Cambridge
Plumian Professors of Astronomy and Experimental Philosophy